The Delawana was a fishing schooner based in Riverport, Nova Scotia.

International Fishing Vessel Championship, 1920
Delawana was the first schooner to represent Canada at the first International Fishing Vessel Championship races in 1920 under command of Capt. Thomas Himmelman from Riverport, Nova Scotia.  On 11 October 1920, Delawana defeated the Canadian schooner Gilbert B. Walters, sailed by Capt. Angus Walters, when the topmast of the Gilbert B. Walters broke during one of the races.  

Much to the dismay of the crew, the Delawana then lost in two straight races to the American Gloucester fishing schooner Esperanto under Capt. Marty Welch. Despite the loss, the crew from Riverport did represent Canada at the first International Fishing Vessel Championship and built a pride in labour that would sustain the community and much of Lunenburg County for over a century.

References
 Yankee Magazine, "We're Off To Win The Cup!", Irene M. Patten, September 1969 
 Collier's Weekly, "The Flying Gloucesterman", James B. Connolly, December 25 1920

External links
Delawana Photo
Riverport District Website
"The Fisherman's Race", October 1930, Popular Mechanics

References 

Sailing ships of Canada
Schooners
Water transport in Nova Scotia